Tinley Park (formerly Bremen) is a village in Cook County, Illinois, United States, with a small portion in Will County. The village is a suburb of Chicago. Per the 2020 census, the population was 55,971. It is one of the fastest growing suburbs southwest of Chicago.  In 2009 BusinessWeek named Tinley as the best place in America to raise a family.

History

19th century
Settlement of the area which now comprises Tinley Park began in the 1820s by emigrants from the Eastern United States. German settlers became predominant in area by the 1840s, and the village was established in 1853. The Village was called Bremen at the time. Irish, English, Scottish, Canadian, and other American settlers were also common in the area.

In the late 19th century, railroads expanded rapidly, and the village happened to be located on the Chicago, Rock Island and Pacific Railroad line. The influence of the railroad on Bremen was so great that, in 1890, its name was changed to Tinley Park in honor of the village's first railroad station agent, Samuel Tinley, Sr. Even the village's official incorporation took place at the train depot on June 27, 1892.

20th century
With the railroad came industry and commerce. 1905 saw the Diamond Spiral Washing Machine Company found its first factory in Tinley Park. Local businessmen established an electric utility in 1909. A bottling facility for pop was operated in Tinley Park until the 1950s. Inventor John Rauhoff developed and manufactured a waterproofing additive for cement called Ironite, later used in the construction of Hoover Dam. In 1956, a building was erected for the new Tinley Park Public Library. In the latter part of the 20th century, Tinley Park was, and remains to be, an area of rapid suburban expansion to the west and south of the original site, with over 11,000 housing units constructed between 1970 and 1994.

Today
After its centennial (1992), Tinley Park from the late 20th century to the present has been focused on renovation of its downtown historic district. The historic district is made up of the village's original 1892 boundaries. In this district, landowners are encouraged to maintain the historic edifices or to create new, historically friendly facades for otherwise non-historic buildings built in the last 30 years.

The Hollywood Casino Amphitheatre (formerly named "The World Music Theater", "Tweeter Center Chicago", and until 2015, "First Midwest Bank Amphitheatre"), an outdoor venue which seats 28,000, is located in Tinley Park.

On February 2, 2008, a mass shooting occurred at Lane Bryant in Brookside Marketplace on the Will County side of the village. The store closed after the shooting.

Geography

It is bordered by Oak Forest to the northeast, Orland Park to the northwest, Orland Hills and Mokena to the west, Country Club Hills to the east. Matteson to the southeast, Frankfort to the southwest and Frankfort Square to the south.

Demographics
As of the 2020 census there were 55,971 people, 21,871 households, and 14,760 families residing in the village. The racial makeup of the village was 80.56% White, 6.41% African American, 0.14% Native American, 4.21% Asian, 0.01% Pacific Islander, 2.31% from other races, and 6.36% from two or more races. Hispanic or Latino of any race were 8.39% of the population.

There were 21,871 households, out of which 51.60% had children under the age of 18 living with them, 54.68% were married couples living together, 10.01% had a female householder with no husband present, and 32.51% were non-families. 29.01% of all households were made up of individuals, and 14.67% had someone living alone who was 65 years of age or older. The average household size was 3.21 and the average family size was 2.56.

The village's age distribution consisted of 21.4% under the age of 18, 7.4% from 18 to 24, 25.9% from 25 to 44, 27.7% from 45 to 64, and 17.5% who were 65 years of age or older. The median age was 40.5 years. For every 100 females, there were 99.1 males. For every 100 females age 18 and over, there were 94.1 males.

The median income for a household in the village was $82,163, and the median income for a family was $103,902. Males had a median income of $61,179 versus $41,084 for females. The per capita income for the village was $40,955. About 4.2% of families and 5.8% of the population were below the poverty line, including 7.8% of those under age 18 and 5.8% of those age 65 or over.

Government
Tinley Park is divided between two congressional districts. Most of the village, including all the area in Bremen Township and Rich Township, as well as the area in Will County, is in Illinois's 1st congressional district; the area in Orland Township south of 167th Street, as well as most of the area southwest of 163rd Street and Ozark Avenue, is in the 3rd district.

Education
Tinley Park includes four public elementary school districts – Kirby School District 140, Community Consolidated School District 146, Summit Hill Elementary School District 161, and Elementary School District 159.

The town also includes three parochial Pre-K through 8 elementary schools: St. George, which is Catholic; Trinity Lutheran, affiliated with the LCMS; and Southwest Chicago Christian School of Tinley Park.

Victor J. Andrew High School (Consolidated High School District 230) and Tinley Park High School (Bremen Community High School District 228) are both secondary schools located in Tinley Park. A small portion of Tinley Park students go to Lincoln-Way East High School. A small portion in the southwest part of the village also attends Rich Central High School.

Most residents of Tinley Park are located within the residency boundaries for Moraine Valley Community College; the rest reside in the community college district for South Suburban College. A very small portion of Tinley Park goes to Joliet Junior College.

Transportation 
Trains only have access to Tinley Park on the Rock Island District. The Oak Park Avenue and 80th Avenue Stations, which are located in Tinley Park, are part of the Rock Island District.

 the village's east–west thoroughfare.
, the village's major north–south throughfare.
 on the western corner of the village.
 on the northern corner of the village.
 the village's major north–south thoroughfare in Cook County.
 the village's second major east-west thoroughfare.
 located entirely in Tinley Park.

Notable people 

 Emil Andres, Indy and Sprint car driver
 Gary Bettenhausen, Indy and Sprint car driver
 Merle Bettenhausen, Sprint car driver
 Tony Bettenhausen, Indy car driver
 Tony Bettenhausen Jr., Indy car driver
 Miles Boykin, wide receiver for NFL's Pittsburgh Steelers
 Frank J. Christensen, labor leader
 Tevin Coleman, running back for NFL's San Francisco 49ers
 John Ericks, pitcher with Pittsburgh Pirates 1995–97
 Armando Estrada, former wrestler with WWE
 Nathan Everhart, wrestler with WWE
 Gina Glocksen, season six finalist on American Idol
 Michael Hastings, Illinois State Senator, 98th General Assembly
 Garrett Jones, outfielder, first baseman with Minnesota Twins, Pittsburgh Pirates, New York Yankees
 Stacie Juris, Miss Illinois Teen USA 2009 and Miss Illinois USA 2013
 Christine Magnuson, Olympic swimmer (two-time silver medalist)
 Real Friends, pop punk band
 Kevin Sefcik, utility player with Philadelphia Phillies and Colorado Rockies
 John J. Szaton, Polish-American sculptor and creator of Coal Miner
 Jeremiah Wright, former minister to Barack Obama

Sister cities
 Büdingen, Germany
 Mallow, Ireland
 Nowy Sącz, Poland

References

External links
 Village of Tinley Park official website

 
Chicago metropolitan area
Villages in Cook County, Illinois
Villages in Will County, Illinois
Villages in Illinois
Populated places established in 1892
1853 establishments in Illinois